Félix «Féfé» Courtinard (born 12 July 1961 in Saint-Joseph, Martinique) is a French basketball player who played 52 times for the France national basketball team between 1987 and 1993 .

References

French men's basketball players
French people of Martiniquais descent
1961 births
Living people
Martiniquais men's basketball players
SIG Basket players